Thrombin inhibitor may refer to:
Direct thrombin inhibitor
Indirect thrombin inhibitor, such as warfarin